Bullia rhodostoma, common name the smooth plough shell, is a species of sea snail, a marine gastropod mollusk in the family Nassariidae, the nassa mud snails or dog whelks.

Description
The length of the shell varies between 25 mm and 50 mm. Bullia rhodostoma are a slow growing, long-lived species with a life span of 15-20 years, following a 0.79 mortality rate, and 0.21 survival rate in their first 3 years. Successful adaptation has occurred because Bullia rhodostoma uses their single foot for crawling fast to search for food (usually stranded organisms, as they are carnivores), burying in the sand and surfing in the water on the shore.

Distribution
This marine species occurs off South Africa.

References

Further reading

External links

 Branch, G.M. et al. (2002). Two Oceans. 5th impression. David Philip, Cape Town & Johannesburg
 

Endemic fauna of South Africa
Nassariidae
Gastropods described in 1847